Adam Stanisław Szustak (born 20 July 1978) is a Polish Roman Catholic priest, Dominican, itinerant preacher, academic chaplain, vlogger and author.

Since 2014, he has been active on the Internet under the name Langusta na Palmie (Crawfish on a palm tree), which was inspired from one of the mosaics in the Basilica di Santa Maria Assunta in the Aquileia, Italy. As of May 2022, his channel on YouTube has over 0.8 million subscribers and has received over 465 million total views. He is one of the most popular Polish preachers.

Life 
In the years 2007–2012 he was a chaplain in the Beczka academic community in Kraków, Poland, and founded the Christian Malak Foundation in 2012. In the same year, he was assigned to a monastery in Łódź and became a itinerant preacher. He currently spends most of his time leading retreats, including retreats held outside of Poland.

In September 2017, he launched a profile on Patronite, the Polish equivalent of Patreon, and since then his account became one of the most popular on the platform with over PLN 57 000 of monthly income and PLN 3.5 million of total revenue as of May 2022.

References 

21st-century Polish Roman Catholic priests
People from Myszków
Polish Dominicans
Polish YouTubers
1978 births
Living people